Andreas Daniel Gabriel Haddad, formerly Andreas Daniel Gabriel Turander (born on 5 May 1982) is a Swedish-Assyrian retired footballer who played as a striker. He is currently the manager of Södertälje FK.

In January 2008, he signed a half-year contract with the club, but the contract was cancelled only two months later due to injuries. Haddad has also played for Swedish side Assyriska Föreningen, and for a short period in Norwegian side Lillestrøm SK on loan and then signed for them in 2006. He has yet to earn a call up to the Swedish national football team and can thus play for Turkey or Iraq should he choose one of them.

He most recently played for Swedish club Assyriska, but left the club in December 2015.

In Lillestrøm SK, Haddad is regarded as cult hero. During his time at the club a subgroup of the official fanclub Kanari-Fansen was formed, called Team Haddad. Even though his spell at the club was a short one, he is remembered as a gifted player.

References

External links

1982 births
Living people
Swedish people of Assyrian/Syriac descent
Swedish people of Iraqi descent
Assyrian footballers
Swedish footballers
Assyrian sportspeople
Lillestrøm SK players
Expatriate footballers in Norway
Swedish expatriate sportspeople in Norway
Swedish expatriate footballers
Eliteserien players
Allsvenskan players
Superettan players
Assyriska FF players
Örebro SK players
Al-Orouba SC players
IF Brommapojkarna players
Expatriate footballers in Oman
Swedish expatriate sportspeople in Oman
Hammarby Fotboll players
Association football forwards